Woodside High School is one of five high schools in Newport News, Virginia. The school was ranked 987th in 2008 by Newsweek magazine's "America's Best High Schools" in terms of high schools and exam testing. The Virginia Department of Education has accredited Woodside since the 2003–04 school year. The school has a twin school, Heritage High School, that was built simultaneously and designed by the same architects.

Woodside High School is a Fully Accredited High School, and it met the Adequate Yearly Progress marks for the No Child Left Behind Act established by the Federal Government.

Woodside is also the home of Newport News Public School's Center for the Arts and Communications Magnet Program, which offers specializations in music, dance, drama, creative writing, communications, and visual arts.

Athletics
Opening in 1996, Woodside's sports teams have won four state titles: one in softball (2001) and three for boys basketball (2003–04, 2004–05, 2022-23).

Demographics 

As of October 2009

2023 February Gun Incident
On February 22, 2023, Woodside High School temporarily went into lockdown after school officials were notified of a student bringing a gun onto campus. The student was searched and taken into custody.

Notable alumni
 Masego - musician

See also 
 Newport News Public Schools

External links 
 Woodside High School

References 

Educational institutions established in 1996
High schools in Newport News, Virginia
Public high schools in Virginia
Magnet schools in Virginia
1996 establishments in Virginia